Schroeppel may refer to:

 Schroeppel, New York
 Richard Schroeppel, American mathematician